I-taliani is an Italian television series, performed by the comedy trio Trettré (Gino Cogliandro, Mirko Setaro and Eduardo Romano) and broadcast on Italia 1.

See also
List of Italian television series

Italian television series